Estanislao Figueras y de Moragas (13 November 1819 – 11 November 1882) was a Spanish politician who served as the first President of the First Spanish Republic from 12 February to 11 June 1873.

Figueras was born in Barcelona.

He led the Republican Party after Queen Isabella II was overthrown in 1868. He briefly became president after King Amadeo abdicated. He was succeeded as president by Francisco Pi y Margall. After the 1875 restoration of the monarchy he withdrew from public life.

He died in Madrid in 1882 at the age of 62.

He is famous for having said, after one more fruitless Council of Ministers:  "Gentlemen, I can not stand this anymore. I will be frank to you: I am up to my bollocks of all of us."

References

 Columbia Encyclopedia, 6th ed
 Sánchez-Solís, Manuel (2009). El republicanismo y el federalismo español del siglo XIX: la búsqueda de un nuevo orden político y social al servicio de los ciudadanos. Centro de Investigación y Estudios Republicanos. p. 204. .

|-

|-

|-

1819 births
1882 deaths
People from Barcelona
Spanish republicans
Prime Ministers of Spain
Politicians from Barcelona
Presidents of the Executive Power of the First Spanish Republic